Prelude: the Best of Charlotte Church is a 'best of' collection spanning the four classical music albums of the 16-year-old soprano Charlotte Church, released in 2002, and also available on DVD-Audio.

Prelude commemorates the end of Charlotte Church's classical career; her next album, Tissues and Issues, would be a pop release.

Track listing
"Pie Jesu"
"My Lagan Love"
"In Trutina"
"Panis Angelicus"
"Amazing Grace"
"Just Wave Hello"
"La Pastorella"
"She Moved Through the Fair"
"Ave Maria"
"Dream a Dream (Feat. Billy Gilman)"
"The Flower Duet"
"Habañera"
"The Prayer (Feat. Josh Groban)"
"All Love Can Be"
"It's the Heart That Matters Most"
"Tantum Ergo"
"Bridge Over Troubled Water"
"Sancta Maria"

Release history

References

External links
Amazon.com: Prelude: The Best of Charlotte Church: Music: Charlotte Church

2002 greatest hits albums
Charlotte Church albums
Albums produced by David Foster
Albums produced by Trevor Horn
Columbia Records compilation albums
Columbia Records video albums
Music video compilation albums
2002 video albums
Classical crossover albums